Raymond Gordon Collier (born 25 October 1961) is a Canadian rower. He competed in the men's coxless four event at the 1988 Summer Olympics.

References

External links
 

1961 births
Living people
Canadian male rowers
Olympic rowers of Canada
Rowers at the 1988 Summer Olympics
Sportspeople from Cranbrook, British Columbia
Pan American Games medalists in rowing
Pan American Games bronze medalists for Canada
Rowers at the 1987 Pan American Games